Symphyotrichum campestre (formerly Aster campestris) is a species of flowering plant of the family Asteraceae commonly known as western meadow aster. It is native to much of western North America where it grows in many habitats, generally at some elevation.

Description
Symphyotrichum campestre is a perennial, herbaceous plant growing to a maximum height near  from a long rhizome. The brown stems, leaves, and some parts of the flower heads are covered with tiny glands on tiny stalks called "stipitate glands". The inflorescence holds several flower heads containing many violet ray florets around a center of yellow disc florets. The fruit is a hairy cypsela.

Citations

References

External links

campestre
Flora of Western Canada
Flora of the Northwestern United States
Flora of the Southwestern United States
Flora of the Rocky Mountains
Plants described in 1840
Taxa named by Thomas Nuttall